Sam Sunderland (born 15 April 1989 in Poole) is a Dubai-based British rally raid motorcycle rider, best known for his participation in the Dakar Rally, which he won in 2017 and 2022.

Career
Sunderland made his Dakar debut in 2012, riding a Honda, after winning the UAE National Baja Championship in 2010 and 2011. He was forced to retire on the third stage due to an electrical fault, and was unable to compete the following year after breaking both wrists in testing prior to the event.

Riding for the factory Honda team in 2014, Sunderland became the first British rider to win a stage of the Dakar since John Deacon in 1998 when he won the second stage to move up to third in the overall classification, only to suffer engine failure the following day and drop out of the rally. Later that year, he was signed to the factory KTM team, winning two stages of the Abu Dhabi Desert Challenge and placing second in the Morocco Rally. Sam went on to win Morocco rally in 2015 and won Qatar sealine rally in 2016. He won the Dakar Rally in 2017.

Sunderland was the recipient of the Royal Automobile Club's 2017 Segrave Trophy "for being the first Briton to win a Dakar Rally crown by winning the motorcycle category in 2017".

In 2018 Dakar Rally Sam won stages 1 and 3 before crashing out in stage 4. 2019 Dakar Rally saw Sam winning stages 5 and 7, and finishing 3rd overall. In 2020 edition in Saudi Arabia Sam crashed out with an injury in stage 5.

Career results

Dakar Rally

References

1989 births
Dakar Rally motorcyclists
Dakar Rally winning drivers
English motorcycle racers
Living people
Off-road motorcycle racers
Segrave Trophy recipients